The Commonwealth War Graves Commission (CWGC) is an intergovernmental organisation of six independent member states; United Kingdom, Canada, Australia, New Zealand, India, and South Africa, established through royal charter to mark, record and maintain the graves and places of commemoration of Commonwealth of Nations military forces killed during the two World Wars. In this capacity, the commission is responsible for the commemoration of 1.7 million Commonwealth servicemen and women in 150 countries worldwide.

Notes

Footnotes

References